Gerard Ross (born December 27, 1982) is a former American football player.

He was signed by the Seattle Seahawks in 2006, activated to their active roster in January 2007,

References

1982 births
Living people
Players of American football from Jacksonville, Florida
American football cornerbacks
Florida State Seminoles football players
Seattle Seahawks players